Euphaedra fontainei is a butterfly in the family Nymphalidae. It is found in the western part of the Democratic Republic of the Congo, Angola and possibly Gabon.

References

Butterflies described in 1977
fontainei